WMNZ (1050 AM) is a radio station broadcasting a country music format. Licensed to Montezuma, Georgia, United States.  The station is currently owned by Buck Creek Music LLC.

References

External links

MNZ
Radio stations established in 1990